Gail J. McGovern (born 1952) is an American businessperson, who became president and CEO of the American Red Cross on June 23, 2008.  McGovern held top management positions at AT&T Corporation and Fidelity Investments.  She is a member of the board of trustees of Johns Hopkins University and the board of directors of DTE Energy.

Early life
Born in 1952 and raised as Gail J. Rosenberg in Springfield, New Jersey.  She received a Bachelor of Arts degree in quantitative sciences from Johns Hopkins University in 1974 and an MBA from Columbia Business School in 1987.

Career
She began at AT&T Corporation as a programmer also working in sales, marketing and management.  Eventually she became the executive vice president of the consumer markets division, the largest business unit, responsible for $26 billion in residential long-distance service.  She held this role from 1997 to 1998.

She joined Fidelity Investments in September 1998 as president of distribution and services.  Her department served 4 million customers with $500 billion in assets.

She was recognized by Fortune magazine in 2000 and 2001 as one of the top 50 most powerful women in corporate America.

She joined the faculty of the Harvard Business School in June 2002 where she taught marketing and consumer marketing to first and second year students.  McGovern was an adjunct faculty of the Harvard Business School.

She assumed the role of president and CEO of the American Red Cross on June 23, 2008, replacing Mark W. Everson, a former IRS commissioner and becoming the seventh chief in seven years.  In June she joined a delegation of 30 community leaders organized by the United States Agency for International Development to visit China and those affected by the 2008 Sichuan earthquake.  The focus of her work at the Red Cross has been to improve the image of the Red Cross brand and thereby increase donations.

In 2015 McGovern became embroiled in a controversy, after writing a letter to congressman Bennie Thompson, which appeared to be an attempt to quash a congressional investigation into the Red Cross's dealing with the federal government during its disaster relief work.

Honors and awards
On May 27, 2020, McGovern was invited to and gave special remarks at her alma mater Johns Hopkins University's 2020 Commencement ceremony. Other notable guest speakers during the virtual ceremony included Reddit co-founder and Commencement speaker Alexis Ohanian; philanthropist and former New York City Mayor, Michael Bloomberg; Anthony Fauci, director of the National Institute of Allergy and Infectious Diseases and later leading member of the White House Coronavirus Task Force; and senior class president Pavan Patel.

McGovern was selected for the inaugural 2021 Forbes 50 Over 50; made up of entrepreneurs, leaders, scientists and creators who are over the age of 50.

Personal
She currently resides in Washington, D.C. with her husband, Donald E. McGovern.  She has three children and two grandchildren.

References

External links

1952 births
Living people
American Red Cross personnel
AT&T people
Johns Hopkins University alumni
Columbia Business School alumni
Harvard Business School faculty
People from Springfield Township, Union County, New Jersey
American business executives
American women business executives
American women academics
21st-century American women